The 1994–95 Open Russian Championship season was the third season of the Open Championship, the second-level ice hockey league in Russia. Neftechimik Nizhnekamsk won the championship by defeating Zapolyarnik Norilsk in the final.

First round

Central Zone

West Zone

Volga Zone

Ural Zone

Siberian-Far Eastern Zone

Group I

Group II

Second round

Central-Volga Zone

West Zone

Ural Zone

1/8 Finals 
 Metallurg Serov – Metallurg Magnitogorsk II 2:1 (1:4, 9:0, 4:3)
 Sputnik Nizhny Tagil – Rubin Tyumen II 2:0 (6:2, +:-)
 Cholmogorez Noyabrsk – Yuzhny Ural Orsk 1:2 (6:3, -:+, -:+)
 UralAZ Miass – SKA Avto Yekaterinburg II 2:1 (1:5, 6:4, 3:1)

Quarterfinals 
 Kedr Novouralsk – Metallurg Serov 0:2 (1:2, 4:7)
 Metallurg Nowotroizk – Sputnik Nizhny Tagil 2:0 (4:1, 9:2)
 Nowoil Ufa – Juschny Ural Orsk 2:0 (6:3, 5:0)
 Metschel Tscheljabinsk – UralAZ Miass 2:1 (1:2, 4:1, 5:1)

Semifinals 
 Metallurg Novotroitsk – Metallurg Serov 2:0 (2:1, 10:1)
 Mechel Chelyabinsk – Nowoil Ufa 2:1 (0:1, 5:0, 3:2)

3rd place 
 Nowoil Ufa – Metallurg Serov 2:1 (1:5, 5:3, 3:1)

Final 
 Mechel Chelyabinsk – Metallurg Novotroitsk 3:2 (3:8, 1:4, 3:1, 7:2, 3:1)

Placing round 
5th-8th place

9th place
 SKA Avto Yekaterinburg II – Metallurg Magnitogorsk II 0:2 (1:3, 1:4)

Siberian-Far Eastern Zone

Playoffs

1/8 Finals 
 Zapolyarnik Norilsk – UralAZ Miass 2:0 (5:2, +:-)
 Metallurg Novotroitsk – SK GSU Belovo 2:1 (4:5, 10:2, 9:2)
 Mechel Chelyabinsk – Ermak Angarsk 2:1 (2:3, 9:1, 8:2)
 SKA Khabarovsk – Cholmogorez Noyabrsk 2:1 (1:7, 6:1, 5:1)
 Dizelist Penza – Neftyanik Almetyevsk 2:1 (0:3, 2:0, 5:1)
 Olimpiya Kirovo-Chepetsk – Nowoil Ufa 2:0 (8:2, +:-)
 Gornyak Olenegorsk – Buran Voronezh 2:1 (5:7, 4:1, 9:2)
 Neftekhimik Nizhnekamsk – Komineft Nizhny Odes 2:0 (4:2, 5:3)

Quarterfinals 
 Zapolyarnik Norilsk – Metallurg Novotroitsk 2:0 (3:2, +:-)
 Mechel Chelyabinsk – SKA Khabarovsk 2:1 (2:6, 4:2, 7:1)
 Dizelist Penza – Olimpiya Kirovo-Chepetsk 2:1 (3:5, 1:0, 6:1)
 Gornyak Olenegorsk – Neftekhimik Nizhnekamsk 0:2 (3:15, -:+)

Semifinals 
 Zapolyarnik Norilsk – Mechel Chelyabinsk 2:1 (3:5, 7:1, 4:3)
 Dizelist Penza – Neftekhimik Nizhnekamsk 0:2 (3:4 SO, 2:4)

Final 
 Zapolyarnik Norilsk – Neftekhimik Nizhnekamsk 1:3 (2:3, 4:5, 4:3, 5:6 OT)

External links 
 Season on hockeyarchives.ru

2
Russian Major League seasons
Rus